Max Dugan Returns is a 1983 American comedy drama film written by Neil Simon and directed by Herbert Ross. It stars Marsha Mason, Jason Robards in the titular role, Donald Sutherland, and Matthew Broderick (in his film debut).

It is the last of five Simon-Ross collaborations, as well as the last of Simon's films starring Mason (his wife at the time).

Plot 
Widowed high school English teacher Nora McPhee lives with her 15-year-old son, Michael, in a broken down house in Venice, Los Angeles. One night, her long-lost father, Max Dugan, appears at her door; she initially does not recognize him, as he went to prison when she was only 9 years old, and disappeared after serving 6 years. He explains that he is dying within the year, and wants to give her and Michael the $687,000 ($ million today) he managed to embezzle from a Las Vegas casino after they appropriated his property, worth that same amount.

Nora meets police detective Brian Costello when her car is stolen and they soon start dating. Nora and her (possible) father conceal his identity from Michael and Brian, with Dugan telling Michael that he knew "Max" in prisonthen tells Nora the same, further obfuscating what she can believe.

Though Nora rejects his money, only wanting his presence in her life, Max continues buying extravagant cars, appliances, and renovations for her and Michael, making it harder for her to hide the truth from an increasingly suspicious Brian. Busybody neighbor Mrs. Litke complicates things by continuously reporting things to the police.

After two weeks together, Nora is now sure that it truly is her father. She pleads with Max to turn himself in, confident that the police will take the money and release him to her care for his final few months. Instead, he leaves a message that he is fleeing to Brazil with part of the money, leaving the rest for them.

Brian stops Nora as she heads to Michael's baseball game. He has figured out who Max is, and that he is dying, and warns her that she could face prison time unless she turns Max in. Nora refuses to do anything until after the game. After Michael hits the game winning home runhis first hit of the season, thanks to training from MLB coach Charley Lau, paid for by MaxNora finally tells Brian everything. She also convinces him that Max is unimportant, and that the off-duty Brian can call in the information after lunch. Max is seen driving away, apparently headed for Brazil.

Cast

Additionally, Kiefer Sutherland (in his film debut) briefly appears as Bill, Mike's school friend.

Production notes
Max Dugan Returns marks the first of only three times (as of 2022) that Donald Sutherland and his son Kiefer have appeared together in a dramatic film project, the others being A Time to Kill and Forsaken, in the latter of which they both starred in the leads.

Matthew Broderick was cast in this film and Simon's play Brighton Beach Memoirs simultaneously.

The real-life father of Matthew Broderick, noted character actor James Broderick (whose birthname is James Joseph Broderick III), died on November 1, 1982  around the time of the making of this film. Co-star Jason Robards, who knew James and was a friend, helped Matthew through his grief over the loss of his father.

Former professional baseball player Charley Lau appears as himself having been hired by Robards' character Dugan to coach Broderick's Michael to hit better for his high school team. At the time of the movie, Lau was the hitting coach for the Chicago White Sox.

This was the last motion picture that Mason and Simon collaborated on before their divorce.

Reception
Roger Ebert of the Chicago Sun-Times gave the film 2.5 stars out of 4, calling it "watchable and sort of sweet."

Gene Siskel of the Chicago Tribune also awarded 2.5 stars out of 4 and wrote:  
Janet Maslin of The New York Times wrote, "Mr. Simon's original screenplay is fast and buoyant, and Herbert Ross's direction shows off the abundant jokes to their best possible advantage. There are certainly some questionable ingredients to the story, but you're not likely to notice them while the film is under way. You're likely to be laughing."

Variety described the film as "a consistently happy comedic fable which should please romanticists drawn again to another teaming of Neil Simon, Marsha Mason and Herbert Ross."

David Ansen of Newsweek wrote, "It's a cute fantasy, and the players are certainly appealing. But Simon overplays his hand. Having created living and breathing comic characters, he starts to suffocate them inside an increasingly mechanized plot. The cuteness gets a bit out of hand."

See also
 List of American films of 1983

References

External links 
 
 
 
 

1983 films
American comedy-drama films
1980s English-language films
Films directed by Herbert Ross
1983 comedy-drama films
20th Century Fox films
Films with screenplays by Neil Simon
Films scored by David Shire
1983 comedy films
1983 drama films
1980s American films